The , known in official  records as , or sometimes known as , is a series of tramcars which was manufactured by Hungarian companies  ("Ganz-MÁVAG Locomotive, Carriage and Machine Factory") and  ("Ganz Electric Factory"). The  tramcars have three main variants, which are all eight axle rail motor coaches with a Bo'2'2'Bo'tr axle arrangement, the last variant being capable of operating as electric multiple units. The cars were manufactured in Budapest between 1964 and 1978, and in overall 152 regular units and two prototypes were made.

The final production variant of the series is capable of controlling another unit of its type through proprietary 50-wire cables, though traction current isn't shared between units. The trams are also capable of sensing the breakup of the tramset with a proprietary system implemented along the couplers. The  was intended to replace the lower capacity  and obsolete, in-house   trams.

 tramcars are still in active service in Budapest, whereas – with the exception of the two prototypes – the first scrapping took place only in 2009, when the only  car was taken out of service owing to maintenance difficulties. The first tramcar entered passenger service in 1965, thus the series is now in continuous service for  years.

Design and manufacturing 

The CSMG series was Ganz's, and thus the Hungarian machine industry's first foray into articulated rail vehicle production as the obsolete CSM Bengáli tramcars made by FVV's in-house Árpád Füzesi Workshop, and Ganz's own lower capacity UV series proved to be inadequate for the growing demands of Budapest's tram network. Thus two CSMG prototypes, sometimes referred to as CSMG-0, were manufactured between 1964 and 1965. These had only one articulation, but were expanded with another body section later to resemble the production variants, as they were in passenger service for some years. After the first CSMG production run however, features were scaled back, this resulted in tramcars having less comfort, but after years of repairs and refurbishments, almost all CSMG cars converged to a general set of specifications referred to as CSMG-E (Csuklós Motorkocsi, Ganz – Egységesített, "Articulated Motor Coach, Ganz – Unified").

Eventually 3 main variants of CSMG tramcars were produced, these variants are shown in the following table.

Between 1991 and 1994, a CSMG car damaged in the 1980s was rebuilt and modernized by Ganz and got the designation KCSV-5 (Korszerűsített Csuklós Villamos, 5-ös típus, "Modernized Articulated Tram, type 5"). Based on the experiences with this car, 30 CSMG cars were refurbished between 1996 and 1999, these were designated as KCSV-7 (Korszerűsített Csuklós Villamos, 7-es típus, "Modernized Articulated Tram, type 7"). These shouldn't be confused with Ganz's last articulated tram type, the similarly designated KCSV-6.

CSMG-related prototypes, refurbishments and other related vehicles are shown in the following table.

See also 

 FVV CSM
 Ganz UV
 Ganz KCSV-6
 Ganz MFAV
 Trams in Budapest
 Ganz Works
 Articulated vehicle

References and notes 

CSMG
Tram vehicles of Hungary
Vehicles introduced in 1965
Ganz Works
600 V DC multiple units